Fort Cobb Reservoir (also called Fort Cobb Lake) is a reservoir located in Caddo County in the U.S. state of Oklahoma. It impounds the waters of Cobb Creek (joining from the west), Lake Creek (joining from the north), and Willow Creek (joining from the northeast). It was constructed in 1958. The towns of Carnegie, Fort Cobb, and Eakly are located nearby.

The dam is a zoned earthfill structure containing 3,569,185 cubic yards (2,729,000 m³) of embankment.

The uncontrolled morning-glory spillway in the left abutment consists of a concrete intake structure, concrete conduit, and concrete chute and stilling basin.

The Fort Cobb Reservoir is part of the Washita Basin Project of the Bureau of Reclamation, which also includes Foss Reservoir on the Washita River in Custer County, along with numerous small flood-control structures on creeks and streams. Municipal and industrial water is supplied to the city of Anadarko and Western Farmers Electric Cooperative through the Anadarko Aqueduct which begins at the Fort Cobb Reservoir.

Recreation and fish and wildlife 
The recreation areas are administered by the Oklahoma Tourism and Recreation Department and the wildlife management area is administered by the Oklahoma Department of Wildlife Conservation. Since reservoir releases are primarily for municipal and industrial demands and flood control, the reservoir does not normally experience drastic drawdowns.

The primary fish species include white and smallmouth bass, channel catfish, walleye, bluegill, bullhead, saugeye and crappie.

The lake offers five RV campgrounds, one RV & Tent campground and four tent campgrounds on the southeast and southwest area of Fort Cobb Lake. Fort Cobb State Park and the wildlife management areas of the lake.

References

External links 
 Fort Cobb Reservoir on TravelOK.com Official Oklahoma Tourism Dept. site
 Fort Cobb Dam - Oklahoma
 Washita Basin Project - US Bureau of Reclamation
 
 Oklahoma Digital Maps: Digital Collections of Oklahoma and Indian Territory
  FTCO2 : Ft. Cobb Lake, OK access date=2019-03-18

Dams completed in 1958
Reservoirs in Oklahoma
Protected areas of Caddo County, Oklahoma
Dams in Oklahoma
United States Bureau of Reclamation dams
Bodies of water of Caddo County, Oklahoma